The Art of Living is a Spanish drama film  directed by Julio Diamante in 1965. It was entered into the 15th Berlin International Film Festival.

Cast
 María del Carmen Abreu - Julia Smeyers
 Anastasio Alemán - Psychologist
 Antonio Buero Vallejo - Father of Pupil of Luis
 Julio Diamante - Comrade of Luis
 Beatriz Galbó
 Juan Luis Galiardo - Juanjo
 Lola Gaos - Mother of Luis
 Luigi Giuliani - Luis
 Montserrat Julió - Ana's Sister
 Lola Losada
 Sergio Mendizábal - Comrade of Luis
 Carlos Muñiz
 Lauro Olmo
 José María Prada - Galvez
 Fernando Sánchez Polack
 Manuel Summers - Adversary
 Elena María Tejeiro - Ana
 Paco Valladares - Santiago

References

External links

1965 films
1960s Spanish-language films
1965 drama films
Spanish black-and-white films
Films directed by Julio Diamante
Spanish drama films
1960s Spanish films